The Salda is a river in Sverdlovsk Oblast, Russia. It is a tributary of the Tagil (in the Ob's drainage basin). The Salda has its sources in the Ural Mountains. The Salda freezes over in late October or early November, and stays frozen until the spring thaw in April.

The towns of Verkhnyaya Salda and Nizhnyaya Salda are by the Salda.

References 

Rivers of Sverdlovsk Oblast